Tony D'Souza is an American novelist, journalist, essayist, reviewer, travel, and short story writer. He has published three novels with the publisher Houghton Mifflin Harcourt including: Whiteman (2006), The Konkans (2008), and Mule (2011).

Life and career
D'Souza was born and raised in Chicago, Illinois. He is multiracial with his father being Mangalorean Catholic and his mother being Euro-American.

While attending Carthage College, he studied fiction. He later earned his master's degree in writing from the University of Notre Dame and Hollins University. He also served for two and a half years in the Peace Corps, working in Côte d'Ivoire, where he was an AIDS educator. D'Souza is married, and has two children.

His first published story won the Black Warrior Review's award for fiction in 1999. His short story "Club des Amis" was published in The New Yorker, and D’Souza later included the essay as a part of his first novel, Whiteman, published in 2006. Whiteman garnered many awardsSue Kaufman Prize from the American Academy of Arts and Letters, New York Times Editor's Pick, People Magazine Critic's Choice, the Florida Gold Medal for General Fiction, and was named one of the "greatest fiction travel books of all time" by Condé Nast Traveler.

His second novel, The Konkans, was published in 2008 and was called "best novel of the year" by The Washington Post.

Published in 2011, Mule was praised by Entertainment Weekly, San Francisco Chronicle, Kirkus Reviews, Library Journal, and Booklist. It was also optioned for film by Hunting Lane Films.

D'Souza has received a 2006 NEA Fellowship, a 2007 NEA Japan Friendship Fellowship, and a 2008 Guggenheim Fellowship in Creative Arts-Fiction. His work has appeared in The New Yorker, Playboy, Esquire, Outside, Mother Jones, Salon, Granta, Tin House, and McSweeney's. He detailed his coverage of Nicaragua's Eric Volz murder trial on The Today Show, Dateline, Bill Kurtis Investigates, E! Channel, the BBC, and NPR.

Bibliography

Novels
Whiteman (2006)
The Konkans (2008)
Mule (2011)

External links
Peace Corps Writers Interview with Tony D'Souza

References

Living people
21st-century American novelists
Carthage College alumni
Writers from Chicago
Notre Dame College of Arts and Letters alumni
Hollins University alumni
Mangaloreans
St. Ignatius College Prep alumni
Peace Corps volunteers
American travel writers
American male journalists
American male novelists
American male essayists
American male short story writers
American expatriates in Ivory Coast
21st-century American short story writers
21st-century American essayists
21st-century American male writers
Novelists from Illinois
Year of birth missing (living people)